Estádio Luiz José de Lacerda, usually known as Lacerdão, is a multi-purpose stadium in Caruaru, Pernambuco, Brazil. It is currently used primarily for football matches. The stadium was built in 1980 and has a capacity of 30,000.

The Lacerdão is owned by Central Sport Club. The stadium is named after Luiz José de Lacerda, who was president of Central Sport Club from 1962 to 1964, 1966, 1977 to 1983, and in 1992 and 1993.

History
In 1980, the works on Lacerdão were completed. The inaugural match was played on October 19 of that year, when Central defeated the Nigeria national football team 3–1. The first goal of the stadium was scored by Central's Gil Mineiro.

The stadium's attendance record currently stands at 24,450, set on October 22, 1986 when Central beat Flamengo 2–1.

In the 1980s, the stadium was reformed and renamed to its current name. Its original name was Estádio Pedro Victor de Albuquerque. Pedro Victor de Albuquerque was one of the first presidents of Central.

References
Enciclopédia do Futebol Brasileiro, Volume 2 - Lance, Rio de Janeiro: Aretê Editorial S/A, 2001.

External links
Templos do Futebol
Federação Pernambucana de Futebol

Football venues in Pernambuco
Multi-purpose stadiums in Brazil
Sports venues in Pernambuco